Donovan's Greatest Hits is the first greatest hits album from Scottish singer-songwriter Donovan. It was released in the United States in January 1969 on Epic Records and in the United Kingdom in March 1969 on Pye Records. Donovan's Greatest Hits peaked at No. 4 on the Billboard 200, and has been certified platinum by the RIAA.

The album was included in critic Robert Christgau's "Basic Record Library" of 1950s and 1960s recordings, published in Christgau's Record Guide: Rock Albums of the Seventies (1981).

History
Donovan's Greatest Hits is a distinct entry in Donovan's discography for several reasons. First, it collects three singles that were previously unreleased on any album: "Epistle to Dippy"; "There Is a Mountain"; and "Laléna." It also presents the unedited "Sunshine Superman" (one minute and fifteen seconds longer than the original 1966 single and LP release), and most of the songs appear for the first time in stereo. Lastly, Donovan's Greatest Hits contains re-recordings of "Catch the Wind" and "Colours" with Big Jim Sullivan playing guitar, John Paul Jones on bass and keyboards and Clem Cattini on drums. Epic Records could not obtain the right to release the original recordings of these two songs, so Donovan recorded new versions in May 1968 with a full backing band and a lavish production by Mickie Most.

It was released in the US on Epic, catalogue BXN 26439 in stereo, and in the United Kingdom in March 1969 on Pye Records, catalogue NPL 18283 in mono and NSPL 18283 in stereo. Donovan's Greatest Hits marked the high point of Donovan's popularity in both the United States and United Kingdom. It also most likely had the effect of keeping many of Donovan's recordings on the shelf to avoid oversaturating the market. Nearly all of Donovan's next studio album was already recorded by the time of this release but remained unreleased until August 1969.

Reissues
In 1987, the original album was issued on compact disc by Epic Records in North America (EK 26439) and Epic/Sony Records in Japan (28·8P-1033). On 30 March 1999, Epic Legacy reissued a remastered version of the album (EK 65730),with the two sides of the original LP reversed which substitutes the original versions of "Catch the Wind" and "Colours" in place of the 1968 remakes and adds four bonus tracks which became hits after the album was first released.

Track listing
All tracks by Donovan Leitch. On NSPL 18283, "Season of the Witch" is the first track on side two.

1969 LP Version (Cat No. BXN 26439)

Side One
"Epistle to Dippy" – 3:08
"Sunshine Superman" (long version) – 4:32
"There Is a Mountain" – 2:33
"Jennifer Juniper" – 2:40
"Wear Your Love Like Heaven" – 2:23
"Season of the Witch" – 4:54

Side Two
"Mellow Yellow" – 3:37
"Colours" (1968 version) – 4:10
"Hurdy Gurdy Man" – 3:15
"Catch the Wind" (1968 version) – 5:01
"Laléna" – 2:54

1999 remastered CD version
"Mellow Yellow" – 3:40
"Colours" (original version) – 2:44
"Hurdy Gurdy Man" – 3:19
"Catch the Wind" (original version) – 2:55
"Laléna" – 2:55
"Epistle to Dippy" – 3:10
"Sunshine Superman" (long version) – 4:31
"There Is a Mountain" – 2:34
"Jennifer Juniper" – 2:42
"Wear Your Love Like Heaven" – 2:24
"Season of the Witch" – 4:55

Bonus tracks
"Atlantis" – 4:59
"To Susan on the West Coast Waiting" – 3:11
"Barabajagal (Love Is Hot)" – 3:19
"Riki Tiki Tavi" – 2:56

Personnel
 Donovan – vocals, guitars, harmonica
 Mike Thompson – guitar, backing vocals
 Big Jim Sullivan — guitar; John Paul Jones — bass, keyboards; Clem Cattini — drums 
 The Jeff Beck Group — backing instruments 
 Mickie Most – producer

Notes

External links 
 Donovan's Greatest Hits – Donovan Unofficial Site

1969 greatest hits albums
Albums produced by Mickie Most
Donovan compilation albums
Epic Records compilation albums
Columbia Records compilation albums
Albums produced by Geoff Stephens